The Forts Ferry Crossing (formerly Delaware City–Salem Ferry and Three Forts Ferry Crossing)  is a ferry system on the Delaware River that serves Forts DuPont and Delaware in Delaware and Fort Mott in Pennsville Township, New Jersey. It is operated by the Delaware River and Bay Authority (DRBA). The ferry operates on weekends from the last weekend in April until the last weekend in September and Wednesday to Sunday between June and Labor Day.

In 2013, service changed so boats travel from Barber's Basin in Salem, New Jersey, to Delaware City, Delaware, where they can catch service to Pea Patch Island/Fort Delaware. This change was made due to Hurricane Sandy damaging the pier at Fort Mott, with uncertainty on when the state would repair the pier.

In March 2015, DRBA officials announced that the Delaware City–Salem Ferry service changed its name to the Forts Ferry Crossing. The ferry returned to its regular schedule between Fort Mott State Park in Pennsville, New Jersey and Delaware City, Delaware, with service to Salem discontinued.

References

External links
Fort Delaware State Park and ferry tickets
Forts Ferry Crossing at VisitNJ.org

Ferries of Delaware
Ferries of New Jersey
Crossings of the Delaware River
Delaware River and Bay Authority facilities
Transportation in New Castle County, Delaware
Transportation in Salem County, New Jersey
Pennsville Township, New Jersey